Paris is a city in and the county seat of Henry County, Tennessee, United States. As of the 2020 census, the city had a population of 10,316.

A  replica of the Eiffel Tower stands in the southern part of Paris.

History
The present site of Paris was selected by five commissioners appointed to the task of choosing a county seat at the December 1822 session of the Court of Pleas and Quarter Sessions of Henry County. A public square, streets, alleys, and 104 lots were laid off, and the lots were sold at auction over a two-day period in either March or April 1823.

Paris was incorporated on September 30, 1823. It was the first town incorporated in West Tennessee, followed by Lexington on October 9, 1824, and Memphis on December 19, 1826. The city was named after Paris, France, in honor of the Marquis de Lafayette, a hero of the American Revolutionary War.

As the county seat, Paris was a center of trade for the rural county, which was largely devoted to agriculture and particularly the cultivation of cotton as a commodity crop. The planters depended on a large workforce of enslaved African Americans. In 1927, a man named Joseph Upchurch was lynched in Paris.

Between about 1970 and 1990, Paris became the center of the Old Beachy Amish. Beachy Amish from different regions moved there to maintain their traditional ways. Because of internal conflicts, most Old Beachy Amish left the region in the early 1990s and had completely vacated it by 2000.

Since the civil war, Paris has had an African American community of around 15%.  Prior to the early 1960's, young black children attended segregated schools.  But beginning in the 1960's, the town of Paris worked in conjunction with Henry County to consolidate all schools, busing all children from the periphery of the county to consolidated, integrated schools in Paris.  The process was largely peaceful.  Also beginning in the 1960's, there was a gradual process of integration of the races in business around the town, also largely peaceful. See Citizendium's article on Paris, Tennessee for more details about how it went.

Read about the lynching of Joseph Upchurch for one known incident of a racial lynching in the town; it occurred in 1927 and was written up in the New York Times.

Geography
Paris is located just south of the center of Henry County at  (36.301229, -88.313815). U.S. Route 641 passes through the city center as Market Street, leading north  to Murray, Kentucky, and southeast  to Camden. U.S. Route 79 passes southeast of the city center as Tyson Avenue and Wood Street; it leads northeast  to Clarksville and southwest  to McKenzie.

The city is drained primarily to the east, by tributaries of West Sandy Creek, flowing to the Tennessee River in Kentucky Lake. The southwest corner of the city drains to the Middle Fork of the Obion River, a west-flowing tributary of the Mississippi River.

Climate
The climate of Paris is humid subtropical (Köppen Cfa) with mild winters and hot summers. Under the Trewartha climate classification, it is a temperate oceanic (Do) climate because only 7 months of the Paris year have a mean daily temperature of 50 °F (10 °C) or higher.

Demographics

2020 census

As of the 2020 United States census, there were 10,316 people, 4,335 households, and 2,556 families residing in the city.

2010 census
As of the census of 2010, there were 10,156 people, 4,394 households, and 2,605 families residing in the city. The population density was 897.4 people per square mile (346.5/km2). There were 4,965 housing units at an average density of 456.4 per square mile (176.2/km2). The racial makeup of the city was 76.99% White, 19.25% African American, 0.34% Native American, 0.64% Asian, 0.01% Pacific Islander, 0.42% from other races, and 2.34% from two or more races. Hispanic or Latino of any race were 1.63% of the population.

There were 4,394 households, out of which 24.8% had children under the age of 18 living with them, 38.5% were married couples living together, 16.8% had a female householder with no husband present, and 40.7% were non-families. 36.8% of all households were made up of individuals, and 19.3% had someone living alone who was 65 years of age or older. The average household size was 2.14 and the average family size was 2.77.

In the city, the ages of population were nearly equally distributed, with 22.94% under the age of 18, 55.89% from 18 to 64, and 21.7% who were 65 years of age or older. For every 100 females, there were 81.5 males. For every 100 females age 18 and over, there were 77.1 males.

The median income for a household in the city was $25,261, and the median income for a family was $32,258. Males had a median income of $27,759 versus $20,198 for females. The per capita income for the city was $15,572. About 14.1% of families and 19.0% of the population were below the poverty line, including 26.6% of those under age 18 and 20.5% of those age 65 or over.

Industry
Local companies  manufacture brakes, small electric motors, aftermarket auto parts, metal doors, rubber parts, school laboratory furniture and Ready to Eat Foods.

Culture

Eiffel Tower

Constructed by students at Christian Brothers University in the early 1990s, the Eiffel Tower was installed in Eiffel Tower Park. The original  wooden tower was later replaced with a  metal structure. The tower is a scale model of the Eiffel Tower in Paris, France.

Eiffel Tower Park provides tennis courts, a public Olympic-sized swimming pool, soccer fields, two walking trails, two children's playgrounds with pavilions, a splash pad, and a frisbee golf course.

Arts
Paris is known for its support of the arts. Many large events of musical nature take place in the city's auditorium, the Krider Performing Arts Center. Known as "KPAC", the building is attached to the city's public elementary school, Paris Elementary.  Additionally, the Paris-Henry County Arts Council hosts artistic events throughout the year, including Arts 'Round the Square and an annual photography showcase.  The Paris Academy for the Arts offers classes and workspace for local artists.

Sports
From 1922 to 1924, Paris was home to a Minor League Baseball team that played in the Kentucky–Illinois–Tennessee League  as the Paris Travelers (1922) and the Paris Parisians (1923–1924). HCHS Football team has won the 5A State Championship twice.

Notable people 
 John Hall Buchanan, Jr. — Representative of Alabama's 6th Congressional District, U. S. House of Representatives 1965–1981, and in other political positions.
 John Wesley Crockett — U. S. House of Representatives 1837–1841, Attorney General of the Ninth Judicial District of Tennessee 1841-1843
 Rosan "Rattlesnake Annie" Gallimore — country musician
 Edwin Wiley Grove — established Paris Medicine Company 1886, endowed E. W. Grove High School 1906
 Isham G. Harris — Tennessee State Senate 1847, U. S. House of Representatives 1848–1852, Tennessee governor 1857–1862, United States Senate 1877–1897, President pro tempore of the United States Senate 1893-1895
 John Hudson - son of Richard "Bill" Hudson and professional football player, played for Super Bowl champion Baltimore Ravens in 2000, played for championship team at Auburn in college.
 Howell Edmunds Jackson — Tennessee House of Representatives 1880–1881, United States Senate 1881–1886, Judge of the Sixth Judicial Circuit 1886–1891, Judge of the Sixth Judicial Circuit Court of Appeals 1891–1893, U.S. Supreme Court Justice 1893-95
 Vernon Jarrett — political activist, social commentator and Chicago Tribunes first African-American syndicated columnist
 Mordecai Wyatt Johnson — a preacher and the first black president of Howard University, serving 1926-1960
 Bobby Jones — gospel musician
 Cherry Jones — actress, Tony Award for Best Actress in a Play 1991- (nominee, Our Country's Good), 1995 (winner, The Heiress), 2000 (nominee, A Moon for the Misbegotten), 2005 (winner, Doubt); Drama Desk Award for Outstanding Actress in a Play 1995 (winner - The Heiress), 1998 (winner, Pride's Crossing), 2005 (winner, Doubt), 2006 (nominee, Faith Healer)
 Merle Kilgore — country musician, songwriter, manager 
 Charles Gilbert "Chick" King — outfielder, Detroit Tigers 1954–56, Chicago Cubs 1958-59 and St. Louis Cardinals 1959, first two-sport professional athlete
 Keith Lancaster — singer, songwriter, and founder of The Acappella Company,
 Vernon McGarity — Congressional Medal of Honor 1946
 Bobby Olive   — former NFL wide receiver for the Indianapolis Colts
 James D. Porter — Judge of the 12th Judicial Circuit of Tennessee (1870–1874), Tennessee governor 1875–1879, president of the Nashville, Chattanooga and St. Louis Railroad Company 1880–1884, Assistant Secretary of State under President Grover Cleveland 1885–1887, Minister to Chile under President Grover Cleveland 1893–1895, Chancellor of the University of Nashville 1901, President of Peabody Normal College 1902, later President of those two schools' merging (George Peabody College) until 1909
 Thomas Clarke Rye — Attorney General of the 13th Judicial District, Tennessee governor 1915–1919, Chancellor of the 8th Chancery Court of Tennessee 1922-1942
 Edward H. Tarrant — Representative of Red River County, Texas in the Texas House of Representatives September–December 1837, Chief Justice of Red River County, Texas 1838, Brigadier General of Fourth Brigade Northeast Texas Defenders, Texas House of Representatives 1849–1853, namesake of Tarrant County, Texas
 Stephen M. Veazey — president, Community of Christ 2005–present
 Hank Williams Jr. — Country musician, has a home "near Paris"
 Felix Zollicoffer — Tennessee State Printer 1835, Comptroller of the Tennessee State Treasury 1845–1849, Tennessee State Senate 1849–1852, U. S. House of Representatives 1853–1859, Brigadier General, Confederate States Army
 Gin Cooley — Model

Paris/Henry County media
Radio stations
 WHNY AM/1000
 W248BK FM/97.5
 WHNY-FM FM/104.7
 WLZK FM/94.1 - "94.1 The Lake"
 WRQR-FM FM/105.5  - KF99-KQ105
 WTPR AM/710 - WENK-WTPR
 WTPR FM/101.7

Newspapers
 The Paris Post-Intelligencer

References

External links

 
 See the Citizendium article on Paris, Tennessee for a more extensive history of the town.

 
Cities in Henry County, Tennessee
Cities in Tennessee
County seats in Tennessee
Populated places established in 1823